Live at the Odeon Hammersmith London is the title of a 1991 comedy album release and a videotaped performance by Billy Connolly. It was recorded and filmed during several of Connolly's performances at the Odeon Hammersmith theatre in London, England, in June 1991 and released in the fall of that year. The album was released by Virgin Records and produced by Stuart Epps.

Connolly combines observations of current political situations with remembrances of his own childhood during the performance. In the introduction to the CD, Billy refers to Carol Thatcher, who had recently walked out of one of his shows, commenting that it was a pity her brother Mark had not driven her home, referring to how he (Mark) had got lost during the Paris-Dakar Rally in 1982.

Other moments from this show include his recounting of a disastrous, diarrhea-and-sunburn-ridden holiday to Ibiza, a school trip to go swimming in the North Sea, and his discussion of the then-current issue regarding pit bulls.

The video version of the performance is longer and includes a number of routines and segments omitted from the album due to their visual nature.

Track listing
Note: although listed as tracks on the CD, the CD does not actually have track breaks.

 Doomsday
 Parliament
 Pit Bulls
 Sheep Dogs
 Doggy Sex
 Multiple Orgasms
 Longevity of Sex
 Algebra
 Chatting Up Women
 Crimpolene Suits
 Underpants
 Tweed Trousers
 Scottish Holidays
 Don't Drink the Water
 Sunny Spain
 Fresh Air Fortnight
 Army Beds
 Swimming in the North Sea
 Sumo Wrestlers
 We Don't Belong in There
 I Laughed
 It Goes Away

Personnel
 Video director: Nobby Clark
 Producer: Stuart Epps
 Editor: Paul Naisbitt

1991 live albums
Billy Connolly albums
Stand-up comedy albums
Virgin Records live albums
Albums recorded at the Hammersmith Apollo